Stanley "Doc" Glenn (September 16, 1926 – April 16, 2011) was a baseball catcher with the Philadelphia Stars of the Negro leagues from 1944 to 1950. He also played three years in the minors and two in the Canadian senior Intercounty Baseball League in southwestern Ontario for the St. Thomas Elgins in the early 1950s.

After his retirement from baseball, Glenn spent 40 years in the wholesale electric supply business. In 2006, Glenn released his first published book entitled, Don't Let Anyone Take Your Joy Away: An inside look at Negro League baseball and its legacy.

Glenn was born in Wachapreague, Virginia, and was signed by hall-of-famer Oscar Charleston out of John Bartram High School in Philadelphia, Pennsylvania.

Honors

In February 1994, Stanley Glenn and several other players from the Negro leagues were honored by Vice-President Al Gore at the White House. 

In 2004, Glenn was inducted into the Eastern Shore Baseball Hall of Fame in Maryland.

NLBPA President and Advocacy

Stanley (Doc) Glenn retired in Philadelphia and was active as president of the Negro Leagues Baseball Players Association's Board of Directors.

Glenn died on April 16, 2011 in Yeadon, Pennsylvania. He is interred at Ferwood Cemetery in Lansdowne, Pennsylvania.

Notes

References

External links
 and Seamheads

1926 births
2011 deaths
People from Accomack County, Virginia
Philadelphia Stars players
20th-century African-American sportspeople
21st-century African-American people